Dolichamphilius brieni is a species of loach catfish endemic to the Democratic Republic of the Congo where it is found in Pool Malebo.

References 
 

Amphiliidae
Fish of Africa
Endemic fauna of the Democratic Republic of the Congo
Fish described in 1959
Taxa named by Max Poll